Kasongo, also known as Piani Kasongo, is a town and a Territory, located in the Maniema Province of the eastern Democratic Republic of the Congo.

Geography
Kasongo lies east of the Lualaba River, northwest of its confluence with the Luama River, at an altitude of 2188 ft (666 m). Kasongos population is approximately 63,000.

The town is served by Kasongo Airport. Kasongo is connected to the provincial capital Kindu by the 150 mile 'Kasongo Road' (a section of National Road 31 (N31)), however the journey takes two days due to the road's poor state. The City also lies on National Road 2 (N2) and Regional Road 629  (R629)

Kasongo is part of the Roman Catholic Diocese of Kasongo

History
The town was founded around 1850-60, but the first Sultan named Dougombi (métis) established in 1868. Ramazani Munia Muhara (Manyema) was the Sultan the town by the time of the Congo-Arab war during 1892–1894 in Kasongo, Maniema

A trading post was established in Nyangwe (Piani-Kasongo) in 1875 by Tippu Tip, an Afro-Arab trader. Nyangwe and the greater part of Kasongo, Maniema became the capital of the Sultanate of Utetera controlled by Tippu Tip and local sultans.  

Its  key trading partner and ally was the Sultanate of Zanzibar and thus, was related to Omani Monarchy through Tippu Tip; However, the death of Said bin Sultan in 1856 saw the division of the Omani Empire between his sons. Two sultanates: an African section called the Sultanate of Zanzibar through Majid bin Said and an Asian section called the Sultanate of Muscat and Oman ruled by Thuwaini bin Said. 

The area was visited by Henry Morton Stanley sometime between 1879 and 1884, on his third expedition.

The territory was at the centre of the Congo-Arab War and the Batetela Revolt in 1898. 

A century later, Kasongo and its inhabitants were severely affected by the Second Congo War (1998-2003), and the CARE and Concern Worldwide NGO's are active in the area.

See also
Congo Rainforest

References

External links 
 Worldstatesmen.org: Details of traditional kingdom leadership, including in Kasongo area

Populated places in Maniema